Reginald William "Rex" Crummack (16 February 1887 – 25 October 1966) was a British field hockey player who competed in the 1920 Summer Olympics. He was a member of the British field hockey team, which won the gold medal, but he did not play in any matches.

References

External links
 
profile

1887 births
1966 deaths
British male field hockey players
Olympic field hockey players of Great Britain
Field hockey players at the 1920 Summer Olympics
English Olympic medallists
Olympic gold medallists for Great Britain
People educated at Rossall School
Olympic medalists in field hockey
Place of death missing
People from Salford
Medalists at the 1920 Summer Olympics